Cotyledion tylodes is an extinct, stalked filter-feeder known from the Chengjiang lagerstatten. The living animal reached a couple of centimetres in height, and bore a loose scleritome of ovoid sclerites.  Its interpretation has been controversial, and it has been previously identified as a carpoid echinoderm, or as a stem group echinoderm.  C. tylodes is now classified as a stem group entoprocta based on new fossils that clearly show a U-shaped gut and a crown of tentacles.

See also
 Dinomischus
 Siphusauctum

References

Maotianshan shales fossils
Prehistoric protostome genera

Cambrian genus extinctions